The National Progressive Party is a political party in Lesotho. 
At the last elections for the National Assembly, 25 May 2002, the party won 0.7% of popular votes and 1 out of 120 seats.

Political parties in Lesotho